Douglas Charles Abbott,  (May 29, 1899 – March 15, 1987) was a Canadian Member of Parliament, federal Cabinet Minister, and justice of the Supreme Court of Canada. Abbott's appointment directly from the Cabinet of Canada as Finance Minister to the Supreme Court was one of the most controversial in the Supreme Court's history.

Early life
Abbott was born in Lennoxville, Quebec (now Sherbrooke, Quebec). He attended Bishop's University, graduating with a Bachelor of Arts.  He then attended McGill Law School, but interrupted his studies to sign up for service overseas, in 1916.  Returning from the Great War, he completed his legal studies, earning his Bachelor of Civil Law.  He then went to France to attend the Université de Dijon.  Returning to Canada, he was called to the Barreau du Québec in 1921 and practised law in Montreal with the firm of Fleet, Phelan, Fleet & Le Mesurier.

Political career
Abbott successfully stood for election to the House of Commons in 1940, and remained a member of the House for fourteen years.  A member of the Liberal Party of Canada, Abbott served as both Minister of National Defence (1945–46) and Minister of Finance (1946–54).

Supreme Court justice

He was appointed to the Supreme Court of Canada on July 1, 1954 and served as Puisne Justice until December 23, 1973.

Abbott was appointed to the court directly from the Liberal Party of Canada's Cabinet, where he had served the previous 7 years as Finance Minister. The appointment is considered one of the most controversial in the history of the Supreme Court. It was the first appointment directly from cabinet since the 1911 appointment of Louis-Philippe Brodeur.

Parliamentary seats

House of Commons 
 16 May 1940 – 16 April 1945: St. Antoine—Westmount, Quebec
 6 September 1945 – 30 April 1949: St. Antoine—Westmount, Quebec
 15 September 1949 – 13 June 1953: St. Antoine—Westmount, Quebec
 12 November 1953 – 30 June 1954: Saint-Antoine—Westmount, Quebec

Parliamentary functions

Ministry 
 18 April 1945 – 11 December 1946: Minister of National Defence for Naval Services
 21 August 1945 – 11 December 1946: Minister of National Defence
 10 December 1946 – 30 June 1954: Minister of Finance and Receiver General

Parliamentary Secretary 
 1 April 1943 – 7 March 1945: Parliamentary Assistant to the Minister of Finance
 8 March 1945 – 16 April 1945: Parliamentary Assistant to the Minister of National Defence

Archives 
There is a Douglas Charles Abbott fonds at Library and Archives Canada. Archival reference number is R4773 (former archival reference number MG32-B6).

References

External links 

 Supreme Court of Canada biography

Canadian Expeditionary Force soldiers
Canadian Ministers of Finance
Defence ministers of Canada
Canadian Anglicans
Members of the House of Commons of Canada from Quebec
Liberal Party of Canada MPs
Justices of the Supreme Court of Canada
Members of the King's Privy Council for Canada
1899 births
1987 deaths
Politicians from Sherbrooke
Anglophone Quebec people
McGill University Faculty of Law alumni